
The following are lists of Netflix original films by year:

Lists 
List of Netflix original films (2015–2017)
List of Netflix original films (2018)
List of Netflix original films (2019)
List of Netflix original films (2020)
List of Netflix original films (2021)
List of Netflix original films (2022)
List of Netflix original films (since 2023)

See also
 List of Netflix original programming
 List of ended Netflix original programming
 List of Netflix original stand-up comedy specials
 Lists of Netflix exclusive international distribution programming

External links
 Netflix Originals current list on Netflix (based on geolocation)

Netflix